Carlos Espinoza (born 21 April 1928) was a Chilean footballer. He played in three matches for the Chile national football team in 1956. He was also part of Chile's squad for the 1956 South American Championship.

References

External links
 
 

1928 births
Possibly living people
Chilean footballers
Chile international footballers
Association football goalkeepers
Everton de Viña del Mar footballers
Santiago Wanderers footballers